Timocratica longicilia is a moth in the family Depressariidae. It was described by Vitor O. Becker in 1982. It is found in Colombia. The habitat consists of tropical montane and tropical lower montane wet forests.

References

Moths described in 1982
Taxa named by Vitor Becker
Timocratica